JS Shimokita (LST-4002) is the second ship of the s of the Japan Maritime Self-Defense Force (JMSDF).

Construction and career 
Shimokita was laid down on 30 November 1999 and launched on 29 November 2000 by Mitsui Engineering & Shipbuilding, Tamano. She was commissioned into the 1st Landing Group on 12 March 2002.

On 7 September 2009, the fifth aviation group together with Okinawa Prefecture to participate in disaster prevention drills, Air Self-Defense Force, Fire Service, NTT, Okinawa Electric Power Company and the Japanese Red Cross Society to train for stacking a variety of vehicles such as ambulance.

From 24 to 27 January 2011, Shimokita and  implemented special training together. In response to the Great East Japan Earthquake off the Pacific coast the vessel was dispatched to respond to the disaster. At the time of the earthquake, the Mitsui Engineering & Shipbuilding Tamano Plant was conducting an annual inspection of the ship, of which completion was accelerated to 1 April, and the vessel joined the disaster relief from 6 April.

From 10 to 26 June 2013, Shimokita participated for the first time in the integrated training Dawn Blitz 13, which was held by the US military at Camp Pendleton, California, and San Clemente Island. In addition,  and  participated from the Ground Self-Defense Force, including the Western Army Infantry Corps and the Western Air Corps and during the exercise period, a US Marine Corps V-22 Osprey. The vertical takeoff and landing transport aircraft landed aboard the ship.

Shimokita participated in the Okinawa Prefectural Comprehensive Disaster Prevention Drill held on Miyakojima, Taramajima, and Irabujima as part of the 2014 remote island integrated disaster prevention drill held from 3 to 6 September 2014. On 4 November as part of the Chenzi 26 exercise, which is a large-scale exercise of the Ground Self-Defense Force's Western Army, the MLRS of the Western Army was being trained to shoot on the ship's deck.

On 1 July 2016, the 1st Transport Corps was reorganized under the Mine Warfare Force. On 6 July Shimokita departed Kure in order to participate in Pacific Partnership 2016, visiting Vietnam, Palau and other port calls to make medical support and returned to Kure on 20 August.

From 8 to 24 May, she participated in amphibious rapid deployment exercises with JS Hyūga in the western waters of Kyushu, Tanegashima, Kagoshima Prefecture, and the surrounding waters. In response to the water outage in Kure city due to the heavy rain in July 2018, a special bath installed on the ship moored in the Kure base mooring moat area was opened to those affected on 8/9 July. On 10 July, Shimokita was in Hiroshima Ujina Port while transporting gasoline, diesel fuel about 124 such kiloliters loaded with tank trucks. After that, bathing and water supply support was provided again until 18 July. The people who took a bath were mainly residents of Etajima City, and were picked up by LCAC from the Hitonose LCAC Maintenance Center in the city. On 25 August, the same year, joint training was conducted with the Royal Navy  in the waters south of Honshu.

Gallery

Citations

Ōsumi-class tank landing ships
Ships built by Mitsui Engineering and Shipbuilding
2000 ships